Kruppomenia  is a family of solenogaster, a kind of shell-less, worm-like, marine mollusk.

Genera 
 Adoryherpia Gil-Mansilla, García-Álvarez & Urgorri, 2009
 Aploradoherpia Salvini-Plawen, 2004
 Birasoherpia Salvini-Plawen, 1978
 Biserramenia Salvini-Plawen, 1967
 Cyclomenia Nierstrasz, 1902
 Diptyaloherpia Salvini-Plawen, 2008
 Helicoradomenia Scheltema & Kuzirian, 1991
 Kruppomenia Nierstrasz, 1903
 Plawenia Scheltema & Schander, 2000
 Sensilloherpia Salvini-Plawen, 2008
 Simrothiella Pilsbry, 1898
 Spiomenia Arnofsky, 2000
Synonyms
 Solenopus Sars, 1869 (part): synonym of Simrothiella Pilsbry, 1898

References 

 Salvini-Plawen L v. (1978). Antarktische und subantarktische Solenogastres (eine Monographie: 1898–1974). Zoologica (Stuttgart) 128: 1–305.
 García-Álvarez O. & Salvini-Plawen L.v. (2007). Species and diagnosis of the families and genera of Solenogastres (Mollusca). Iberus 25(2): 73-143

Solenogastres